Geoffrey Grey (born 26 September 1934) is a British classical composer.

Biography

Geoffrey Grey was born in Gipsy Hill and lived on the edge of Dartmoor until the onset of the second world war, when he was sent to Scotland to live with his paternal grandparents.

A career as a concert violinist had been envisaged and encouraged by his parents as he had shown a precocious interest in the violin at a very early age. Edinburgh, however, was markedly unfriendly to the English in those days, and its indigenous juvenile population openly hostile to any child with artistic pretensions.

In spite of this he eventually went to the Royal Academy of Music and studied violin, composition, piano and conducting. His composition teachers were William Alwyn, Benjamin Frankel and later, in Paris, Nadia Boulanger.

In 1959 he went to New Zealand where he freelanced as a violinist for a time until he was appointed Tour Musical Director of the NZ Opera Company. He had a number of early pieces broadcast by the NZBS and returned to England in 1960.

He now had a family to provide for and took the job of Director of the Suffolk Rural Music School. This only lasted for a year and then he moved to London where he lived and freelanced as a violinist for the next forty years.

He held a number of principal positions over this period with some of the major orchestras and continued to compose for many different combinations of instruments. He was very active in London musical life and gave many recitals of contemporary music as well as his own compositions.

He played for the ballet, musicals and pop concerts and on a number of occasions toured with the Lindsay Kemp Theatre Company as violist, pianist & percussionist.

In 1992 he went to the Netherlands, working there for a year.

In 1996 in went to live first of all in Cornwall and then Margate where he concentrated almost exclusively on composing.

In March, 2003, after his friend Edwin Carr died, he contacted the oboist Dominique Enon to make the piano transcription of the Oboe Concerto which the composer dedicated to this oboist before the latter's death.
This meeting turned out to be fruitful and Grey subsequently returned to France to become involved with the Radio France and in particular the conducting of Kurt Masur. He also maintained contact with Dominique Enon for to whom he has dedicated a work for oboe and piano.
Their meeting has also resulted in the publishing of some of his works in France by Gilles Manchec, publishing director of Armiane in Versailles

He now lives in Dorset and in 2007 had three new works published.

His works

Works by date

1956 The Tinderbox, for Narrator, Violin & Piano
1958 Sonata in C (Piano)
1958 The Pied Piper of Hamelin (Opera for Children)
1959 A Christmas Cantata (Boys/Girls Voicestring Orchestra)
1961 Sonata No.1 for Violin & Piano
1962 Six Cavalier Songs (High Voice & Piano)
1963 Capriccio for String Orchestra
1964 Sarabande (Ballet for Sadlers Wells Opera Ballet)
1964 Patterns (Ballet for Sadlers Wsells Opera Ballet)
10. 1964 Cock Robin, Betty Botter, Lullaby for Voices (Children's’ pieces)
1967 Dance-Game (Full Orch.)
1967 Serenade for Double w/w quintet (for Portia Wind Ensemble)
1967 String Quartet No.1
1968 Sonata for Brass (3Tr. 3 Tbn)
1968 Aria for Flute (Oboe) & Piano
1969 Inconsequenza (for Percussion quartet) [Issued in 1969 on a vinyl LP played by the London Percussion Ensemble]
1969 Flowers of the Night (Violin & Piano)
1969 Quintet for Woodwind
1969 Notturno (String quartet)
1969 Autumn ‘69 (The Prisoner) for 4 instrumental ensembles
1969 John Gilpin (Solo SATB & w/w quintet)
1970 Divertimento Pastorale (Brass quintet)
1970 The Autumn People (Chamber Orchestra)
1970 Sarabande for Dead Lovers (Suite from the ballet “Sarabande”) (Full Orchestra)
1971 A Mirror for Cassandra (Piano, Vln, Oboe, Hrn, ‘Cello)
1971 12 Labours of Hercules (Narrators & Full Orchestra, Comm. NCO)
1972 Songs for Instruments (Septet)
1972 Saxophone Quartet
1972 Concerto Grosso No.1 for String Orchestra
1972 Ceres (Ballet by Antony Tudor)
1973 Summons to an Execution , Dirge, Celia (Voice & Piano, Voice and String Orchestra)
1974 A Dream of Dying (Soprano & Ensemble)
1975 March Militaire No.1 for Brass & Percussion
1975 Three Pieces for Two Pianos
1975 Concertante for 2 Solo Violins & Chamber Orchestra
1975 Tryptych (Large Orchestra)
1976 Sonata for ‘Cello & Piano
1977 Dreams of a Summer Afternoon (Violin, Horn & Piano)
1978 Song from “Death’s Jest Book” (Soprano & Piano)
1980 Variations for Orchestra
1981 12 Studies for Piano.(Book 1)
1981 Suite for Strings
1983 Sonata for Clarinet & Piano
1984 Contretemps (for w/w quartet, comm. Nove Music)
1984 Three Songs for Soprano, Clarinet & Piano
1985 A Morning Raga (Double Bass & Piano)
1986 Sonata for Viola & Piano (comm. Roger Chase)
1988 Sonata in Four Movements (Violin & Piano)
1988 Partita for Trumpet & Piano
1988 Concerto Grosso No2. (Solo Violin & String Orchestra, Comm.Blackheath Strings)
1989 10 Easy Pieces (Piano, Vln, Hrn, Oboe)
1996 A Bit of Singing & Dancing (Full Orch) (Comm.Dartford S/O)
1996 Quintet ("The Pike"), for piano, violin, viola, violoncello, and double bass (Hermes Ensemble, Rosslyn Hill)
1997 Sherzo Strepitoso (Full Orchestra)
1997 4 Bagatelles for 2 Flutes
1998 Cantar de la Siguiriya Gitana (Tenor & Piano Trio, Comm.Jose Guerrero)
1999 Flowers of the Night (Arr. For Flute & Piano)
1999 Preamble & 5 Variations for Bassoon & Piano (Comm.John Orford)
2000 Partita for Trumpet & Piano Arr.for Tr./Strings
2001 De Vinetas Flamencos (Tenor & Piano, Comm. Jose Guerrero)
2002 Tango alla Sonata for Cor Anglais & Piano
2002 Threnody, Capriccio & Anthem (Oboe choir)
2003 The weather in the East (Flute, Clarinet, Bassoon & Piano)
2004 A Scene from Old Russia (Piano Trio)
2004 The Man in the Moon (a capella SATB)
2004 Shine, Candle, Shine (a capella SATB)
2005 The Screech-Owl (Bestiary) for piano solo
2005 The Disaster (Theatre piece for multiple ensembles)
2005 Aubade for Oboe & Piano (Comm. Domimique Enon)
2006 Concertino de Printemps for Piano & Orchestra.
2007 Trio Concertante for Piano, Oboe & Bassoon (Comm. John Orford)

Arrangements by date

The Seasons, (Tchaikovsky) for String Quartet
Selection of works by Grieg for String Quartet
Tartini Solo Sonatas for Violin & Harp
Victorian Salon Pieces for Piano Trio
Irish Suite for String Quartet
Francesa da Rimini (Tchaikovsky)for 16-piece orchestra
Sicilian Vespers Ballet Music (Verdi) for 16-piece orchestra

References

External links
Geoffrey Grey site
 Bibliographie nationale française 
http://www.rogerchase.com
Last recording CD

1934 births
Living people
English classical composers
20th-century classical composers
Alumni of the Royal Academy of Music
English male classical composers
20th-century English composers
20th-century British male musicians